Aeginetia is a genus of plants in the broomrape family Orobanchaceae, native mostly to tropical Asia and also Cameroon (in Africa).

I is found within Assam, Bangladesh, Borneo, Cambodia, southern China, East Himalaya, India, Japan, Jawa, Korea, Laos, Malaya, Myanmar, Nansei-shoto, Nepal, New Guinea, Ogasawara-shoto, Philippines, Sri Lanka, Sulawesi, Sumatera, Taiwan, Thailand and Vietnam.

The genus name of Aeginetia is in honour of Paul of Aegina (c. 625 – c. 690), a Byzantine Greek born physician best known for writing the medical encyclopedia, Medical Compendium in Seven Books. It was first described and published in Sp. Pl. on page 632 in 1753.

Species
, Plants of the World Online recognises the following species:
Aeginetia acaulis 
Aeginetia flava 
Aeginetia indica 
Aeginetia mirabilis 
Aeginetia mpomii 
Aeginetia selebica 
Aeginetia sessilis 
Aeginetia sinensis

References

Orobanchaceae
Orobanchaceae genera
Plants described in 1753
Taxa named by Carl Linnaeus